Jay Valai is an American football coach and former player. He is currently the co-defensive coordinator for the University of Oklahoma Sooners football team.

Playing career

Valai was a four-year letter winner at Wisconsin as a defensive back where he served as a captain in 2010. He earned second team All-Big Ten (coaches) honors in 2008 and 2009. He totaled 153 tackles, four forced fumbles and a pair of interceptions in 48 career games.

Coaching career

Early Coaching Career
Jay began his coaching career at Georgia as a defensive quality control coach, where he served in that position in 2016 and 2017. In 2018 he went to the NFL and coached under Andy Reid with the Chiefs as a defensive quality control coach. In 2019 he returned to the college ranks as the cornerbacks coach for Rutgers. In 2020 he went to his home state of Texas becoming the Longhorns cornerbacks coach.

Alabama
After Texas fired Tom Herman, Valai left the program and on January 20, 2021, he was announced as  Houston's cornerbacks coach. However he would change his mind and on February 1 the Philadelphia Eagles announced that they hired Valai as cornerbacks coach for the inaugural staff for  Nick Sirianni. However twelve days later Alabama announced that they  hired Valai as the team's cornerbacks coach.

Oklahoma
On January 11, 2022, Valai would move schools once again and become the co-defensive coordinator for Oklahoma.

Personal life
Valai and his wife Courtney have two daughters and a son.

References

Living people
Year of birth missing (living people)
Place of birth missing (living people)
Wisconsin Badgers football players
American football defensive backs
Oklahoma Sooners football coaches
Georgia Bulldogs football coaches
Kansas City Chiefs coaches
Rutgers Scarlet Knights football coaches
Alabama Crimson Tide football coaches
African-American coaches of American football
African-American players of American football
21st-century African-American people
20th-century African-American sportspeople